Veeraiyan is a 2017 Tamil language action drama film directed by Fareed. The film stars Inigo Prabhakaran and Shiney in the lead roles while Aadukalam Naren stars as the titular character.

Cast 
 Inigo Prabhakaran as Usilai
 Shiney as Arivazhagi 
 Aadukalam Naren as Veeraiyan 
 Vasanth as Ilavarasan
 Kayal Vincent as Valukka 
 Preethisha as Mokka 
 Vela Ramamoorthy as Devarajan 
 Alagu as Driver

Production 
Fareed, the co-producer of Kalavani, made his directorial debut with this film which is set in the 1990s in Tanjore. The film revolves around three different sub-plots that will all connect in the last 15 minutes of the film.

Soundtrack
Soundtrack was composed by S. N. Arunagiri.
"Pollaa Paya" - Jagadeesh, Namitha 
"Nee Medhuva Paricha" - Namitha 
"Ayyo Ayyo" - Sundar
"Arasal Aaiten" - Gaana Sathiya 
"Patta Sarayam" - Guru

Release 
The Times of India gave the film two out of five stars and criticized the film by saying that " Veeraiyan has a few moments, but the disorganized screenplay hampers the narration from being effective" while praising the performances of Aadukalam Naren. The Deccan Chronicle gave the film the same rating and wrote that "But the problem is with the confusing screenplay and a slow narration". On the contrary, the reviewer praised the film's songs and drew comparisons to Ilaiyaraaja.

References

External links 

2017 films
Indian action drama films
Films set in 1990
2017 directorial debut films
2017 action drama films